Heavens Peak is located in the Livingston Range, Glacier National Park in the U.S. state of Montana. The mountain's descriptive name first appeared on a map prepared by Lt. George P. Ahern, from 1888-1890 reconnaissance maps prepared by him. This geographical feature's name was officially adopted in 1929 by the United States Board on Geographic Names.

Geology

Like other mountains in Glacier National Park, the peak is composed of sedimentary rock laid down during the Precambrian to Jurassic periods.

Climate
Based on the Köppen climate classification, the peak is located in an alpine subarctic climate zone with long, cold, snowy winters, and cool to warm summers. Temperatures can drop below −10 °F with wind chill factors below −30 °F.

See also
 Mountains and mountain ranges of Glacier National Park (U.S.)

References

External links

 Weather forecast: Heavens Peak

Mountains of Flathead County, Montana
Heavens
Livingston Range
Mountains of Montana
Going-to-the-Sun Road